Recovery Township is one of the fourteen townships of Mercer County, Ohio, United States.  The 2000 census found 1,550 people in the township, 1,149 of whom lived in the unincorporated portions of the township.

Geography
Located in the southwestern part of the county, it borders the following townships:
Washington Township - north
Butler Township - northeast
Granville Township - southeast
Gibson Township - south
Madison Township, Jay County, Indiana - southwest corner
Noble Township, Jay County, Indiana - west

Part of the village of Fort Recovery is located in southwestern Recovery Township.

Name and history
Recovery Township was established in 1831. It is the only Recovery Township statewide.

Government
The township is governed by a three-member board of trustees, who are elected in November of odd-numbered years to a four-year term beginning on the following January 1. Two are elected in the year after the presidential election and one is elected in the year before it. There is also an elected township fiscal officer, who serves a four-year term beginning on April 1 of the year after the election, which is held in November of the year before the presidential election. Vacancies in the fiscal officership or on the board of trustees are filled by the remaining trustees.

References

External links
County website

Townships in Mercer County, Ohio
Townships in Ohio